Marco Paolini (born March 5, 1956) is an Italian stage actor, theatre director, dramaturge and author.

Personal background 
Paolini is the son of a railroad engineer and a housewife from Belluno, Italy. In the 1970s, he moved to Treviso and started working in theatre.

Professional background 
Paolini's repertory includes civil theatre. His performances usually consist of monologues with frequent use of the Venetian language, irony and satire. Inspired by Dario Fo, he is an Italian exponent of narrative theatre.

Until 1994, Paolini worked with various theatre groups, including Teatro degli Stracci, Studio 900 of Treviso, Tag Teatro of Mestre in Venice and Laboratorio Teatro Settimo. In 1995, received the Ubu Prize for writing Il racconto del Vajont (translated: The Vajont Tale), which was dedicated to the disaster of the Vajont Dam in Italy. The ceremony aired on Rai 2 Italian television.

Since 1999, he has produced his own works with his company JoleFilm. He has also collaborated with the Italian folk band I Mercanti di Liquore, along with the lead singer, Lorenzo Monguzzi.

Theatre 
 Album teatrali (five tales from 1987 to 1999)
 Il racconto del Vajont (1994)
 Appunti forestali (1996)
 Il milione – Quaderno veneziano di Marco Paolini (1997)
 Appunti foresti dal Milione quaderno veneziano (2002)
 I Bestiari (four tales from 1998 to 1999)
 I-TIGI Canto per Ustica (dedicated to the Ustica Massacre) (2000)
 Parlamento chimico – Storie di plastica (2001)
 Song no. 32 (2003)
 Karma-Kola (2006)
 Teatro Civico, sei monologhi per Report (six tales, 2003)
 Album dal teatro alla televisione (13 tales, 2005)

 Miserabili – Io e Margaret Thatcher (2007)
 Il Sergente (inspired by Il sergente nella neve (1953) by Mario Rigoni Stern) (2007)
 Album d'Aprile (2008)
 La macchina del capo (Racconto di Capodanno) (2009)
 Ausmerzen (2012)
 Itis Galileo (2012)

Filmography 
 Manila Paloma Blanca – Daniele Segre (1992)
 Caro diario – Nanni Moretti (1993)
 Il toro – Carlo Mazzacurati (1995)
 I piccoli maestri – Daniele Luchetti (1998)
 Ritratti: Mario Rigoni Stern – C. Mazzacurati and M. Paolini (1999)
 La lingua del santo – Carlo Mazzacurati (2000)
 Vivere – Franco Bernini (2001)
 A cavallo della tigre – Carlo Mazzacurati (2002)

Discography 
 Marco Paolini legge Ernesto Calzavara (2001)
 Sputi, with the "Mercanti di Liquore" (2004)
 Marcovaldo di Calvino letto da Paolini (Audiobook with "L'espresso") (2006)
 Miserabili with the "Mercanti di Liquore" (2008)

Bibliography 
 Presotto, Carlo. L'isola e i teatri, Bulzoni (2001)
 Cannella, Claudia.  "Dossier Teatro di Narrazione," in Hystrio (2005)
 Guccini, Gerardo. La bottega dei narratori, Rome: Dino Audino editore (2005)
 Soriani, Simone. "Dario Fo, il teatro di narrazione, la nuova performance epica. Per una genealogia di un quasi-genere," in Forum Italicum (2005)
 Perissinotto, Cristina. "Polo, Paolini e Venezia: riflessioni lagunari," in Italica (2005)

References

External links 

 
 Marco Paolini and JoleFilm official website

Italian male stage actors
Italian theatre directors
Italian dramatists and playwrights
Dramaturges
People from Belluno
People from Treviso
1956 births
Living people